Abby Lynn Crumpton (born April 6, 1981) is an American soccer forward/defender who last played for Boston Breakers of Women's Professional Soccer. She was inducted in 2022 into the University of Michigan Athletic Hall of Honor.

References

External links
 Boston Breakers player profile
 WUSA player profile
 Asheville Splash player profile
 Western Michigan coaching profile

1981 births
Living people
Women's association football forwards
Women's association football defenders
Atlanta Beat (WUSA) players
Boston Breakers players
Michigan Wolverines women's soccer players
Soccer players from Michigan
American women's soccer players
Boston Aztec (WPSL) players
21st-century American women
Women's Professional Soccer players
Charlotte Lady Eagles players
USL W-League (1995–2015) players
Women's United Soccer Association players